Garidi may refer to:
 Sidi Garidi Cemetery, is a cemetery in Algiers.
 Mohamed Ryad Garidi, is an Algerian rower.